The Ritharrngu (Ritharrŋu, Ritharngu) and also known as the Diakui (and variant spellings), are an Aboriginal Australian people of Arnhem Land in the Northern Territory, of the Yolŋu group of peoples. Their clans are Wagilak and Manggura (of the Dhuwa moiety), and Ritharrŋu (of the Yirritja moiety).

Language
The Ritharrŋu language is a Yolŋu Matha language. In modern times Ritharrŋu has been observed to be undergoing significant structural changes away from Yolŋu, with innovations in its morphosyntaxis through assimilation of features characteristic of Nunggubuyu and Ŋandi.

Country
They also inhabit the area east of the Goyder River, whose tributaries' headwaters form their southernmost frontier. They also inhabit the area around the Mitchell Ranges and the Koolatong River headwaters.

Wagilak are amongst the clans living at Ŋukurr (formerly Roper River Mission).

Social organisation
The Ritharrŋu are organised into three clans, two pertaining to the Dhuwa moiety and one to the Yirritja moiety of the Yolŋu people.

Dhuwa moieties.
 1. Wagilak. (Wagelag, Wawilak, Waurilak, Nunydjulpi, Nundjulpi, Nundjulbi)
 2. Manggura. (Manggurra).

Yirritja moiety.

 3. Ritarngu. (Ritarungo, Ritharrngu, Ridarngo, Ritaringo, Rittarungo, Ritharingau, Ridarngu, Buranadjini).

Alternative names
 Dhiyakuy
 Dijogoi
 Djikai, Jikai, Tchikai

Source:

Notable people
At Ŋukurr:
 Artist Djambu "Sambo" Burra Burra (born c.1946)
 Artist Amy Jirwulurr Johnson (wife of Burra Burra)

Notes

Citations

Sources

Further reading
 A Selected bibliography of the Wagilak / Wawilak language and people held in the AIATSIS Library 

Yolngu